Palahalli  is a village in the southern state of Karnataka, India. It is located in the Shrirangapattana taluk of Mandya district in Karnataka. It is known for having the first sugar factory being built when it was a British colony.

Demographics
 India census, Palahalli had a population of 6763 with 3478 males and 3285 females.

See also
 Mandya
 Districts of Karnataka

References

External links
 http://Mandya.nic.in/

Villages in Mandya district